The 1962–63 Connecticut Huskies men's basketball team represented the University of Connecticut in the 1962–63 collegiate men's basketball season. The Huskies completed the season with an 18–7 overall record. The Huskies were members of the Yankee Conference, where they ended the season with a 9–1 record. They were the Yankee Conference Regular Season Champions and made it to the first round of the 1963 NCAA Division I men's basketball tournament. The Huskies played their home games at Hugh S. Greer Field House in Storrs, Connecticut, and were led by seventeenth-year head coach Hugh Greer and first-year head coach George Wigton.

Hugh Greer led UConn until he died on January 14, 1963, of a massive heart attack.  Assistant George Wigton finished out the season and led them to the NCAA Tournament.  UConn credits the first 10 games of the season to Greer and the rest of the season (including the NCAA Tournament) to Wigton.

Schedule 

|-
!colspan=12 style=""| Regular Season

|-
!colspan=12 style=""| NCAA Tournament

Schedule Source:

References 

UConn Huskies men's basketball seasons
Connecticut
Connecticut
1962 in sports in Connecticut
1963 in sports in Connecticut